Jolanda Plank (born 14 June 1958) is a retired Italian alpine skier who competed in the 1976 Winter Olympics.

References

External links
 

1958 births
Living people
Italian female alpine skiers
Olympic alpine skiers of Italy
Alpine skiers at the 1976 Winter Olympics
Place of birth missing (living people)
20th-century Italian women